Humberto Alejandro Lugo Gil (May 4, 1934 Huichapan, Hidalgo - Mexico City, May 9, 2013) was a Mexican politician, and a member of the Institutional Revolutionary Party, which held the positions of Federal Deputy, Senator and Governor Substitute Hidalgo.
Humberto Lugo Gil came from a political family of the Hidalgo state, and is related to the governors Bartolomé Vargas Lugo, Jose Lugo Guerrero -his father, Javier Rojo Gomez, Jorge Rojo Lugo, and Adolfo Lugo Verduzco.
He held numerous elected and popularly elected federal deputy twice, from 1967 to 1970 to the XLVII legislature and 1979 to 1983, Secretary General of (CNOP), from 1982 to 1985, the legislature LII Congress of Mexico, was president of the Chamber of Deputies and VI responded to the government report Jose Lopez Portillo in which he announced the nationalization of private banks twice. He was Senator for the state of Hidalgo, from 1976 to 1982 and from 1988 to 1994. He was appointed governor of Hidalgo to the resignation of Jesús Murillo Karam. He was General Manager of Airports and Auxiliary Services for the Government of Miguel de la Madrid.
He died on May 9, 2013 in Mexico City.

He was the President of the Chamber of Deputies in 1982.

References

1934 births
2013 deaths
Governors of Hidalgo (state)
Members of the Chamber of Deputies (Mexico)
Presidents of the Chamber of Deputies (Mexico)
Members of the Senate of the Republic (Mexico)
Presidents of the Senate of the Republic (Mexico)
Institutional Revolutionary Party politicians
20th-century Mexican politicians
People from Huichapan
Politicians from Hidalgo (state)